To Bina Bhala Lagena is a 2008 Indian Oriya film directed by Jyoti Das.

Plot 
The film starts with the first encounter happening between Deepak (Sabyasachi) and Jyoti (Rupali). The scene has been narrated in a very genuine way. The romance that eventually blossoms between the two characters Deepak and Jyoti with the violin sessions and Deepak coming up for Jyoti's safeguard have been handled very delicately in the film. The scenes looks very romantic and yet very classy. The introduction scene of Pupinder justifies his colourful character of "Suraj" portrayed in the film. The fast half of the Movie is almost flawless with proper pace and the movie continues almost with a single flow without much constraints but however post interval the movie becomes almost predictable and it seems like an old wine in a new bottle. Sometimes the pace of the movie tends to get slower specially after when Deepak becomes aware of his friend's love interest and attempts to make his love to get sacrificed for his friend Suraj's happiness.

References

External links
 To Bina Bhala Lagena
 

2008 films
2000s Odia-language films